The following is a list of characters that first appeared on the Channel 4 soap opera Hollyoaks in 2000, by first appearance.

Matt Musgrove

Matthew "Matt" Musgrove is a fictional character from the long-running Channel 4 soap opera Brookside, and later Hollyoaks, played by Kristian Ealey. After his initial appearance in Brookside, the character transferred as a regular on its sister show Hollyoaks. Kristian Ealey died on 3 May 2016, aged 38.

Brookside
Matt first appears on Brookside Close when he and his family move into Number 8 in October 1998. During his time on the close, Matt befriends Tim O'Leary, Leo Johnson and his cousin Jerome. Matt becomes involved in marijuana, and various fights. Matt's older brother, Luke is accused of raping neighbour Nikki Shadwick, which leads to a feud between the Musgrove and Shadwick families. In early 2000, The Musgroves leave Brookside Close due to Luke's confession to raping Nikki.

Hollyoaks
In February 2000, Matt moves to Hollyoaks village in Chester as a janitor at Hollyoaks Community College, where he becomes close friends with Theo Sankofa and Alex Bell. He then falls for student and radio show host Chloe Bruce. However, he is not keen on asking Chloe out as he feels that she may dislike him due to his occupation. Therefore, Matt decides to phone her on her radio show and pretend to be someone else. When Matt finally reveals himself, Chloe is disappointed – leaving Matt's worst fears confirmed.

Despite this setback, Chloe decides to give Matt a chance and the pair become a couple. The relationship is going well, until Chloe has self-image issues and begins to push Matt away. This results in the pair breaking up, which leaves Matt disappointed due to his love for her. Matt ends up having a one-night stand with new student Eve Crawford, but he is reluctant not to carry on with the relationship, as it is Chloe who he wants to be with. Eventually, Matt and Chloe get back together, as Matt supports her through her problems. Matt eventually proposes to Chloe. The pair become engaged and Chloe's demands for the wedding prove to be expensive. However, Matt is adamant to give her the best wedding ever. He turns to The Loft owner Scott Anderson, and soon becomes involved in Scott's counterfeit money scam. Matt manages to pay for the wedding with counterfeit money, but it proves costly. On his wedding day, the police turn up and Chloe learns the truth about Matt's dealings with Scott. Knowing about Matt lies, Chloe decides she does not want to go through with the wedding, leaving Matt to face the police on his own. Matt makes a brief return in August 2004 in order to win Chloe back. Chloe considers at it at first but ultimately she refuses and leaves Matt on the platform as she boards the train to London.

Matt makes a brief return in 2004, in the late night spin-off Hollyoaks: After Hours, where he is working as a sailor and helps Ben Davies, Jake Dean, Joe Spencer and Dan Hunter escape from a mob who are running after them.

Laura Burns

Victoria Hutchinson

Victoria Hutchinson, played by Fiona Mollison, first appears in 2000 before leaving in 2001. She later appeared in 2005. Victoria meets Finn (James Redmond) and begins a relationship with him. She discovers Finn is a friend of her son, Tony Hutchinson (Nick Pickard). Tony is averse to the relationship. Despite this the pair become engaged and soon after marry. After Victoria discovers Finn has cheated the relationship breaks down and the pair divorce.

Lorraine Wilson

Lorraine Wilson is a fictional character on the long-running Channel 4 British television soap opera Hollyoaks. She appears throughout 2000 and is played by Jo-Anne Knowles. Lorraine is a night club owner. She meets and befriends Lewis Richardson (Ben Hull). Lewis begins gambling in a casino she owns and after he mounts up a debt she loans him money. She offers Lewis the option to cancel the debt by having sex with her which Lewis agrees to. Lorraine has been described as a "randy older woman" while her storyline with Lewis was described as a "sizzling sex shocker".

Steph Cunningham

Chloe Bruce

Abby Davies

Taylor James

Taylor James, played by Michael Prince, made his first appearance on 17 April 2000. Taylor was a student at Hollyoaks Community College. He worked on the school radio station with Alex Bell, as well as a journalist for The Review. In October 2000, Taylor witnessed a drug deal by Lorraine Wilson's guards at The Loft, and informed Lewis Richardson. Lewis refused to do anything about the situation, resulting in a loud confrontation between the pair. Upon leaving the club, Taylor was followed by the guards and viciously assaulted.

Jess Holt

Jess Holt, played by Frankie Hough, first appeared in 2000 before leaving in 2001. Jess was a prostitute and girlfriend of Sol Patrick (Paul Danan), who she met whilst he was homeless, when he helped her escape from her pimp Steve. When Sol moved back to The Dog in the Pond, he brought Jess with him. However Steve found her and torched the pub on New Year's Eve 2000, leaving Jess almost blind. Jess remained living with Sol and was given a job at Deva by Andy (Ross Davidson) and Sue Morgan (Eve White). Steve refused to back down and confronted both Jess and Sol, which escalated when Steve fell off a barge and was knocked unconscious. When Steve recovered from his injuries, he returned for a final showdown which led to Jess pushing him over The Loft balcony. Jess and Sol decided to flee the village to avoid imprisonment over Steve's attack.

Ben Davies

Will Davies

Izzy Davies

References

, Hollyoaks
2000